South Royalton is an unincorporated village and census-designated place (CDP) in the town of Royalton, Windsor County, Vermont, United States. With a population at the 2010 census of 694, South Royalton is the largest community in the town. It is home to the Vermont Law School. The central portion of the village is a historic district, listed on the National Register of Historic Places as the South Royalton Historic District. The Joseph Smith Birthplace Memorial is located approximately two miles to the east. South Royalton is the town pictured in the opening credits of the WB television show Gilmore Girls.

Geography
South Royalton is located in northern Windsor County along the White River. Vermont Route 14 runs along the north side of the river, just outside the CDP limits, leading southeast to White River Junction and northwest to Barre. Vermont Route 110 leads north from South Royalton into Tunbridge. Interstate 89 passes to the west of the village but does not serve it with a direct exit.  Access to South Royalton is either from Exit 2 (at Sharon) or Exit 3 (at North Royalton).

Buildings

South Royalton has a row of storefronts on Chelsea St., facing the South Royalton Green. The village also has numerous churches, the Royalton Memorial Library, the South Royalton Railroad Station (now housing a bank), and Vermont Law School buildings including Debevoise Hall (formerly the village schoolhouse).

See also
 List of census-designated places in Vermont
 South Royalton dome house
 Chelsea Street Bridge (Royalton, Vermont)

Further reading
 , with accompanying photographs.

References

External links

Census-designated places in Vermont
Census-designated places in Windsor County, Vermont
Royalton, Vermont
Unincorporated communities in Windsor County, Vermont
Unincorporated communities in Vermont